Rosemary Elizabeth Cooper (born 5 September 1950) is a British health official and former politician. Cooper was a Liberal and later Liberal Democrat member of the Liverpool City Council from 1973 until 1999, when she joined the Labour Party. After leaving the council the following year, she was the Labour Member of Parliament (MP) for West Lancashire from 2005 until her resignation in 2022, when she was named chair of the Mersey Care NHS Foundation Trust.

Early life and career
Cooper was born in Liverpool, the daughter of deaf parents. She was educated at St Oswald's Roman Catholic Primary School, Old Swan, Bellerive Convent Grammar School, and the University of Liverpool.

Cooper originally worked for a company called W. Cooper Ltd from 1973 to 1980, before joining Littlewoods initially as a buyer when, in 1994, she became the public relations manager and then, in 1995, the group corporate communications manager. She became a project coordinator in 1999, before she left Littlewoods in 2001, when she was appointed director at the Merseyside Centre for the Deaf.

She was a member of the Liverpool Health Authority and held the position of vice chair between 1994 and 1996. In 1996, she became chair of Liverpool Women's Hospital.

She has also acted as a trustee of the Roy Castle Lung Cancer Foundation.

Liberal Democrats to Labour
Cooper was elected, aged 22, to the Liverpool City Council as a Liberal councillor in 1973 and, in 1992, became the Lord Mayor of Liverpool. She remained on of the council until 2000.

She fought her first Westminster campaign at the 1983 general election when she was selected to contest the Conservative-held seat of Liverpool Garston as a Liberal. She finished in third place, more than 14,000 votes behind the winner, Labour's Eddie Loyden.

Next, Cooper contested the 1986 Knowsley North by-election, caused by the resignation of the Labour MP Robert Kilroy-Silk to become a television presenter. At the by-election, Labour retained the seat with George Howarth gaining a comfortable margin of 6,724 votes; when Cooper contested the seat again a few months later at the 1987 general election she finished 21,098 votes behind Howarth.

At the 1992 general election, now a Liberal Democrat, she was back in her native Liverpool, coming second at Liverpool Broadgreen 7,027 votes behind Labour's Jane Kennedy, but ahead of the former deselected Labour MP Terry Fields.

From 1973 to 1996, Cooper was councillor for the Broadgreen ward. From 1996 to 2000, Cooper represented the Allerton ward, before in 1999 she switched to the Labour Party, becoming a partymate to former general election opponents Loyden, Howarth and Kennedy, and stood in the Netherley ward in 2000, though she did not win and left the council that year. She contested the European Parliament elections in 2004 for Labour in the North West.

Parliamentary career
Cooper became the Labour Party's candidate from an all-female short list, in the constituency of West Lancashire at the 2005 general election, following the retirement of the sitting MP Colin Pickthall. Cooper was first elected to the House of Commons at her fifth attempt and third party with a majority of 6,084. She made her maiden speech on 24 May 2005. In September 2005, Cooper, as part of the Labour Friends of Israel, made an official research visit to Israel. In September 2020, she was appointed a vice-chair of Labour Friends of Israel.

Following her election in 2005, she became a member of the Northern Ireland Affairs Committee, and was part of the successful campaign that stopped the merger of the Southport and Ormskirk hospitals. In June 2006, she became Parliamentary Private Secretary to Lord Rooker, a Minister at the Department for Environment, Food and Rural Affairs.

On 9 August 2006, The Daily Telegraph wrote that Cooper had written to the Prime Minister's office reporting the viewpoint of some of her constituents expressed to her, that they would be appalled if Baroness Thatcher were to be given a state funeral, as a leader more politically divisive than others of the late twentieth century.

In 2007, she became Parliamentary Private Secretary to Ben Bradshaw, initially when he was Minister of State in the Department of Health until 2009, when she remained his PPS when he was made Secretary of State for Culture, Media and Sport. She is a member of the All-Party Parliamentary Health Select Committee.

In August 2013, she became one of the few Labour MPs to vote against the Marriage (Same Sex Couples) Bill, which eventually passed with cross-party support.

On 26 October 2017, a 31-year-old man, Christopher Lythgoe, associated with the proscribed neo-Nazi terror group National Action, was charged with encouragement to murder Cooper, and was also charged along with six other men with being members of a proscribed organisation, contrary to section 11 of the Terrorism Act 2000. 
On 12 June 2018, Jack Renshaw, 23, of Skelmersdale, Lancashire, admitted in a guilty plea to buying a 48 cm (19 in) replica Roman Gladius sword (often wrongly referred to in the media as a machete) to kill Rosie Cooper the previous summer. In July 2018, Lythgoe was jailed for eight years for being a member of the group and his part in the plot to murder Cooper.

Cooper was re-elected at the 2019 general election with a reduced majority.

In 2020 Cooper called for the Nursing and Midwifery Council to be "replaced with a body which can instil confidence" after a nurse, who was found guilty of bullying, was only handed a 12-month suspension.

Cooper supported Lisa Nandy in the 2020 Labour Party leadership election.

In June 2021, Cooper introduced a Private members' bill which would give British Sign Language legal recognition and enhance its use in public services. The bill was backed by the government in January 2022.

Resignation
In September 2022, Cooper announced she accepted a new role as chair of Mersey Care NHS Foundation Trust and would resign as MP for West Lancashire triggering a by-election. She would be the first woman MP to vacate a seat for an actual paid office under the Crown and the first MP to do so since 1981, when Warrington's Thomas Williams was appointed a circuit judge.

In November, The Times reported that Cooper was delaying her resignation in order to secure a peerage, which prompted criticism from several figures such as Adrian Owens, leader of the Our West Lancashire party and former Conservative rival to Cooper in the 2010 general election who suggested that she was "inexcusably" absent from key votes in Parliament.

Cooper was appointed Crown Steward and Bailiff of the Chiltern Hundreds on 30 November and formally succeeded Beatrice Fraenkel as chair of Mersey Care NHS Foundation Trust, stating that "representing West Lancashire in Parliament has been the greatest honour of my lifetime".

References

External links
 
 The Labour Party – Rosie Cooper
 Guardian Unlimited Politics – Rosie Cooper
 BBC Politics page

News items
 Thatcher's future funeral irks her in August 2006

1950 births
Living people
20th-century English women politicians
21st-century English women politicians
Alumni of the University of Liverpool
Councillors in Liverpool
English public relations people
Female members of the Parliament of the United Kingdom for English constituencies
Labour Friends of Israel
Labour Party (UK) MPs for English constituencies
Labour Party (UK) councillors
Liberal Democrats (UK) councillors
Liberal Democrats (UK) mayors
Liberal Democrats (UK) parliamentary candidates
Liberal Party (UK) councillors
Liberal Party (UK) parliamentary candidates
Mayors of Liverpool
Members of the Parliament of the United Kingdom for constituencies in Lancashire
People from Old Swan
Politicians from Liverpool
Politics of the Borough of West Lancashire
UK MPs 2005–2010
UK MPs 2010–2015
UK MPs 2015–2017
UK MPs 2017–2019
UK MPs 2019–present
Women councillors in England
Women mayors of places in England